Afrasiab Kola may refer to:
 Afrasiab Kola, Babol
 Afrasiab Kola, Nur